Leonard William Hamilton (7 July 1899 – 31 May 1987) was an Australian politician. Born in Jarrahdale, Western Australia, he was educated at Perth Boys School before becoming a wheat and sugar farmer. He served in the military from 1917 to 1920 and from 1940 to 1945. In 1946, he was elected to the Australian House of Representatives as the Country Party member for Swan, defeating Labor MP Don Mountjoy. In 1949, he transferred to the new seat of Canning, where he remained until his retirement in 1961. Hamilton later served as President of the Western Australian branch of the Country Party. He died in 1987.

References

1899 births
1987 deaths
National Party of Australia members of the Parliament of Australia
Members of the Australian House of Representatives for Swan
Members of the Australian House of Representatives for Canning
Members of the Australian House of Representatives
People from Peel (Western Australia)
20th-century Australian politicians